Lagoecia, wild cumin,  is a genus of flowering plants in the family Apiaceae. It has only one species, Lagoecia cuminoides, native to the Mediterranean region and as far east as Iran. Its essential oil contains 72.83–94.76% thymol, quite a bit more than thyme (Thymus vulgaris) itself.

References

Apioideae
Monotypic Apioideae genera
Plants described in 1753
Taxa named by Carl Linnaeus